Trace Lee "Tracy" Baker (November 7, 1891 – March 14, 1975) was a first baseman in Major League Baseball who played for the Boston Red Sox. Baker batted and threw right-handed. He was born in Pendleton, Oregon, and studied at the University of Washington, where he played college baseball for the Huskies in 1910.

Of the more than 16,000 players in major league history, Baker is also among the 900-plus players on the Elias Sports Bureau registry who got into only one game. He was 19 years old. Baker's one big-league game came on June 19, 1911. In his only plate appearance, he executed a sacrifice bunt. On the field he made four putouts without committing an error.

Baker served in the US Army during World War I and worked in the Kaiser Shipyards during World II. He died in Placerville, California, at the age of 83.

References

External links

Baseball Almanac

1891 births
1975 deaths
Boston Red Sox players
Major League Baseball first basemen
People from Pendleton, Oregon
Washington Huskies baseball players
Baseball players from Oregon
United States Army personnel of World War I